With Love may refer to:

Music

Albums 
 ...with Love, by Mary Byrne
 With Love (Amanda Lear album), 2006
 With Love (Bobby Vinton album), 1974
 With Love, Chér, 1967
 With Love (Christina Grimmie album), 2013
 With Love (Craig Owens album), 2009
 With Love (Michael Bublé EP), 2006
 With Love (Mýa EP), 2014
 With Love (Pete Townshend album), 1976
 With Love (Rosemary Clooney album), 1980
 With Love (Rosie Thomas album), 2012
 With Love (Tony Bennett album), 1972
 With Love (Zomby album), 2013
 With Love, a 2021 album by Jo O'Meara
 With Love, a 1992 album by Michael Crawford

Songs 
 "With Love" (Hilary Duff song), 2007
 "With Love" (Tamta song), 2007
 "With Love", a song by Thin Lizzy from Black Rose: A Rock Legend
 "With Love", a 1959 song by Cathy Carr

Other uses 
 With Love... Hilary Duff, a fragrance by Hilary Duff
 With Love (Westlife fragrance), a fragrance by Westlife
 With Love (film), a Canadian thriller film
 With Love (TV series), an American television series

See also 
 With Luv', a 1978 album by Luv'